Battambang River (Steung Battambang, also spelled Stoĕng Battambang) is a river in Cambodia. It is a major tributary of the Tonlé Sap.

References

Rivers of Cambodia
Tonlé Sap